Vonda Ward (born March 16, 1973) is an American former professional boxer and NCAA basketball player. As a boxer, she competed from 2000 to 2008 and held multiple heavyweight world championships, including the WBC title in 2007. She also challenged Ann Wolfe for the WIBA and IBA female light heavyweight titles in 2004, in which she suffered her only defeat, losing by knockout in the first round.

Early life and basketball career
Ward grew up in a sports-oriented family; her father, Larry Ward, is a famous harness racer.

Ward played basketball at Trinity High School in Garfield Heights and was twice named Ohio's "Ms. Basketball." She made "Parade All American" teams twice. She was recruited by Division I universities across the United States.

In 1991, Ward accepted a basketball scholarship at the University of Tennessee. While a member of Pat Summitt's Lady Vols, Ward played in one NCAA basketball championship game (1995) during her college career at Tennessee, losing to the University of Connecticut. She competed with USA Basketball as a member of the 1993 Jones Cup Team that won the Bronze in Taipei. After her college career ended in 1995, Ward played for a professional basketball club in Germany. She later played for the American Basketball League's Colorado Xplosion. In 2012, she was inducted into the Ohio Basketball Hall of Fame.

Boxing career
After a broken leg cut her professional basketball career short, Ward turned her attention to boxing.

Ward's boxing debut occurred on January 15, 2000, when she knocked out Faye Steffen in round one at LaPorte, Indiana. Her first four fights all ended in first-round knockout wins for Ward. On April 27, 2000, she met Genevia Buckwalter in New York. Buckwalter became the first fighter to make it out of the first round against Ward, but Ward still won on a second-round knockout. Ward's next five rivals did not make it past the second round, with two first-round knockouts and three second round wins. At this point of her career, she had a streak of twelve knockout wins in a row.

On February 2, 2001, she met prospect Kisha Snow as part of the state fair celebrations in Columbus, Ohio. Snow came into the fight undefeated after six bouts, and she and Ward engaged in a four-round war, but Ward made Snow her thirteenth straight knockout victim one minute into the fourth and final round. Ward then face Carley Pesente, on June 16, at Kansas City, Missouri. Pesente lasted two rounds.

After one more win, Ward challenged for the IBA's world's heavyweight title on August 16, 2002. Ward became the champion, but saw her knockout win streak gone as Monica McGowan lasted ten rounds at Canton, Ohio.

Ward defended her title successfully with an eighth-round knockout of Kathy Rivers on December 6 at the Gund Arena in Cleveland. On March 1, 2003, she and Martha Salazar made their Las Vegas debut, with Ward taking a four-round split decision win in a non-title bout.

After one more win, Ward unified her IBA world Heavyweight title with the WIBA's by defeating Salazar in a rematch, held on July 11 in Canton. Ward won by decision.

On May 8, 2004, Ward fought a nationally televised championship bout with Ann Wolfe in Biloxi, Mississippi. At one minute and one seconds of the first round, Wolfe knocked out Ward with a devastating right to the chin, which was even more devastating by the fact that Ward inadvertently jumped forward into the impact of the punch, leaving Ward unresponsive on the mat for a matter of minutes. This first-round knockout defeat caused her to lose her title and her undefeated status. Ward had a neck concussion because she hit the canvas with her neck when she fell, and she was hospitalized after this bout.

On December 12, 2004, Ward returned to the boxing ring, knocking out Marsha Valley in four rounds in Cleveland. In February 2010, Ward won the inaugural WBC female heavyweight title, defeating Martha Salazar for the third and final time by unanimous decision.

Ward announced her retirement on 2010. Her boxing record stands at 23 wins and 1 loss, with 17 wins by knockout.

Professional boxing record

References

External links
Vonda Ward's official website
 

1973 births
Living people
American women boxers
Basketball players from Ohio
Centers (basketball)
Colorado Xplosion players
Parade High School All-Americans (girls' basketball)
People from Macedonia, Ohio
Tennessee Lady Volunteers basketball players
World heavyweight boxing champions